Golf was inducted at the Youth Olympic Games at the second edition in 2014. This marked the return of Golf to the Olympics programme after 110 years, as it was voted an Olympic sport for the 2016 Summer Olympics.

Medal summary

Boys' individual

Girls' individual

Mixed team

Medal table
As of the 2018 Summer Youth Olympics.

See also
Golf at the Summer Olympics

References

External links
Youth Olympic Games

 
Sports at the Summer Youth Olympics
Youth Olympics